The Lion Grove Garden (Suzhou Wu: Sy tsy lin yoe) is a garden located at 23 Yuanlin Road in Gusu District (formerly Pingjiang District), Suzhou, Jiangsu, China. The garden is famous for the large and labyrinthine grotto of taihu rocks at its center. The name of the garden is derived from the shape of these rocks, which are said to resemble lions. The garden is recognized with other classical gardens in Suzhou as a UNESCO World Heritage Site.

History 

"Of all the famous rock-gardens in history, only one has survived. This is the so-called 'Lion Garden' in Suzhou ." The Lion Grove Garden was built in 1342 during the Yuan Dynasty by a Zen Buddhist monk, Wen Tianru, in memory of his teacher Abbot Zhongfeng. At that time the garden was part of the Bodhi Orthodox Monastery.  The name of the garden is derived from the lion-shaped taihu rocks, which in turn were built as a reference to the symbolic lion in the Lion's Roar Sutra. According to a garden record of the Yuan dynasty, there were ten thousand bamboo plants and many eccentric rocks in the Lion Forest. Among those rocks, one peak of them looks like a lion, thus, the garden has named The Lion Forest Garden. The name also refers to the Lion Peak of Mount Tianmu in Lin'an City, Hangzhou, Zhejiang, where Abbot Zhongfeng attained nirvana. At that time, the garden was 6,670 m2 and was covered in rock and bamboo. After Wen Tianru's death, the garden fell into disrepair, but in 1589 another Buddhist monk, Mingxing, rebuilt the garden. The magistrate of  bought the garden, and his son Huang Xi rebuilt the garden in 1771.

The garden's name was then changed to the 'Garden of Five Pines'. Starting in 1850, the garden fell into disrepair once again. In 1917, Shanghai pigment merchant, Bei Runsheng, grandfather of I. M. Pei, purchased the garden and finished the restoration in 1926. Many buildings and rocks in the garden have been preserved since the restoration. After the death of Bei Runsheng in 1945, the Lion Forest Garden was managed by his grandson Bei Hwanzhang. According to official signs posted in the garden, the Bei family "donated" the garden to the Chinese government in 1949. This words on the signs seem curious because all private property was nationalized by the Communist Party in the same year. The garden was not opened to the public until 1956.

The garden's design attracted the attention of notable visitors, such as the painter Ni Zan, who created the painting Picture Scroll of Lion Grove in 1373. In 1703, the Kangxi Emperor visited the garden, and in 1765, the Qianlong Emperor also visited the garden and left a tablet True Delight personally inscribed by him as a gift. He also had a replica of the garden constructed in the Changchun garden of the Summer Palace and at the Chengde Mountain Resort.

Design 

The 1.1 ha garden is divided into two main parts, a housing complex and rockery around a central pond. In addition to the 22 buildings the garden also houses 25 tablets, 71 steles, 5 carved wooden screens, and 13 ancient specimen trees, some dating back to the Yuan Dynasty. The garden is most famous for its elaborate grotto of taihu rocks. This 1154 m2 grotto contains a maze of 9 paths winding through 21 caves across 3 levels. The pond divides the grotto into the east and west sections. The formal entrance to the western section is called the Eight Diagram Tactics located across the Jade Mirror Bridge from the Pointing at Cypress Hall. The taihu stone peaks are located atop this grotto. The most famous attraction in the grotto is the Lion Peak, surrounded by four other stones - sandesh bansal, Xuan Yu, Tu Yue, and Ang Xiao - which collectively form the Famous Five Peaks. There is a folktale about two immortals, Iron-Crutch Li and Lü Dongbin, who wandered into the maze of the Lion Grove and lost their way, after which they settled in a cave to play chess.

See also 
 Chinese garden
 Suzhou

Notes

References
 

 

 

, retrieved 2020-02-07

External links 
 

 

 
 Classical Gardens of Suzhou, UNESCO's official website on World Heritage Site.

Classical Gardens of Suzhou
AAAA-rated tourist attractions
Major National Historical and Cultural Sites in Jiangsu